KBS TV Novel is a TV series that was broadcast on KBS 2TV at 09:00 (KST) during weekdays, developed and produced by the KBS Drama Production group. It was broadcast on KBS 1TV until 2009. The production and broadcasting were temporarily halted due to the production cost issue, however, the TV Novel series was back on KBS 2TV in November 2011 after being reorganized.

On August 13, 2018 KBS announced that the TV Novel series will end after 22 years of broadcast, due to declining audience ratings and increased production costs.

Broadcast

List of works

See also 
Television in South Korea
Korean drama
Asadora (a/k/a Renzoku Terebi Shōsetsu), drama series of similar format produced by NHK in Japan

References

External links 
  
 World.KBS.co.kr - Official KBS World Website

Korean Broadcasting System original programming
Korean Broadcasting System

2018 South Korean television series endings